The Shields of the Revolution Council (Hayat Duru al-Thawra) was  a Syrian FSA-rebel alliance affiliated with the Muslim Brotherhood of Syria. Bashar al-Assad labeled the Syrian branch of the Muslim Brotherhood as an extremist “terror” group. It joined the Syrian Revolutionary Command Council on 3 August 2014.

In March 2014, the Fatiheen Brigade, Eman Brigade and Sihem al-Haq Brigade, previously affiliated with the Shields, split from the group and joined the newly formed Sham Legion alliance.

Member groups
 Dera al-Jabal

See also
List of armed groups in the Syrian Civil War

References

External links

  

Anti-government factions of the Syrian civil war